Temur Tugushi (24 February 1972 – 18 August 2021) was a Georgian professional football player and manager.

Honours
Dinamo Batumi
 Georgian Cup: 1998
Dinamo Tbilisi
 Georgian League: 1998–99

References

External links

1972 births
2021 deaths
Soviet footballers
Footballers from Georgia (country)
Expatriate footballers from Georgia (country)
Expatriate footballers in Israel
Georgia (country) international footballers
FC Dinamo Tbilisi players
Bnei Yehuda Tel Aviv F.C. players
FC Dinamo Batumi players
Association football midfielders
Football managers from Georgia (country)
Deaths from the COVID-19 pandemic in Georgia (country)